The 2012–13 Albanian Women's National Championship was the 4th season of women's league football under the Albanian Football Association.

The League was won by KF Ada Velipojë, its third consecutive title. By winning, KF Ada qualified to 2013–14 UEFA Women's Champions League.

Teams

League table

References

External links
Kampionati Federata Shqiptare E Futbollit 
Albanian Women's Football Championship 2012/13 UEFA.com

Albania
Women's National Championship
Albanian Women's National Championship seasons